Peter Jan Fudakowski (1954) is a London-based film producer, writer and director. Fudakowski, born in London to Polish emigrants, didn’t go to film school but he studied Economics at Magdalene College, Cambridge (where he was President of the Cambridge Union Society in Michaelmas Term 1976). He graduated with a master's degree and later read for an MBA at the business school INSEAD, France.

In 1979 he joined the First National Bank of Chicago, where he worked in the film financing department. In 1982 Fudakowski left to set up his own production company with his wife, Henrietta Williams, as script editor and head of development. Their company, Premiere Productions Ltd, marked its 20th year in the film business with the production of Tsotsi, which won an Oscar for Best Foreign Film in 2006. Following this Fudakowski and Williams developed film projects, including The Secret Sharer and Corams Children. Fudakowski directed Secret Sharer, shot on location in Thailand and China, which was released in the UK in June 2014. In November 2014 Fudakowski was awarded the Wings Award by the Polish Film Festival in America.

Peter Fudakowski is son of Wojciech and Danuta Fudakowski. His family is of noble Polish origin. His grandfather Jan Fudakowski was a Polish officer, author of military memoirs and was also the inspiration for Jasiu - a character in Thomas Mann’s novella Death in Venice. Peter Fudakowski has a son and a daughter from his marriage to Williams.

Filmography
Secret Sharer (2014) (director, writer, producer)
 Hysteria (2011) (executive producer)
Keeping Mum (2005) (associate producer)
Tsotsi (2005) (producer)
Country of My Skull (2004) (associate producer)
Piccadilly Jim (2004) (associate producer)
Bugs! (2003) (executive producer)
Helen West (2002) TV Series (executive producer)
The Last September (1999) (executive producer)
Trial by Fire (1999) (TV) (executive producer)
Prowokator (1995) (associate producer) (as Piotr Fudakowski)

References

External links
"Peter Fudakowski" on IMDB 
Official Tsotsi website 
Presidents of the Cambridge Union Society (1815–2005)
Secret Sharer website  

Alumni of Magdalene College, Cambridge
INSEAD alumni
English film producers
Living people
Polish businesspeople
Presidents of the Cambridge Union
British people of Polish descent
Year of birth missing (living people)